Smuggler (stylized in all caps) is a Japanese manga series written and illustrated by Shohei Manabe. It was serialized in Kodansha's Monthly Afternoon from May 2000 to August 2000 and published in a single volume. A live-action film adaptation was released in October 2011.

Production
Manabe took inspiration from the works of filmmaker Quentin Tarantino in the making of the series.

Media

Manga
Written and illustrated by Shohei Manabe, the series began serialization in Kodansha's Monthly Afternoon in May 2000; it completed its serialization in August 2000. Its chapters were collected into a single tankōbon volume, which was released on August 21, 2000. A one-shot prequel was released in August 2011.

In August 2005, Tokyopop announced that they licensed the series for English publication. After Tokyopop ceased publishing the series, it was licensed by One Peace Books in March 2013.

Film
A live-action film adaptation was announced in October 2010. Directed by Katsuhito Ishii and starring Satoshi Tsumabuki, the film was released on October 22, 2011. A spin-off drama for mobile devices was released on October 7, 2011.

In March 2012, Cinema Asia Releasing announced that they licensed the film for international distribution. However, in January 2014 Funimation and Giant Ape Media announced that they licensed the film. They released the film on DVD on April 1, 2014.

Reception
Ken Haley from Pop Culture Shock praised the story and characters, though felt the art in the early portion of the series was ugly and amateurish. In Manga: The Complete Guide, writer Jason Thompson praised the artwork as realistic and the story as "well-written [and] tightly plotted".

References

External links
  
 
 

2010s Japanese films
Funimation
Kodansha manga
Live-action films based on manga
Manga adapted into films
Seinen manga
Suspense anime and manga
Tokyopop titles